The Irienyi (also known as Abiirienyi) is a community of Bantu people who inhabit Gwassi district in Homa Bay County, Western Kenya. Gwassi is the common reference to their homeland.

Ethnic groups in Kenya